Mama Ouattara (22 June 1951 – June 12, 2004) was a footballer from Bouna, Ivory Coast. He played for French clubs Nîmes Olympique, Montpellier HSC, Olympique Avignonnais and homeland club Stade d'Abidjan, as well as the Ivory Coast national team.

Following his playing career he pursued a career in coaching, being assigned a job in the Ivory Coast national team in 2002. He took the Ivorian junior team to second place at the 2003 African Youth Championship in Burkina Faso and subsequently led the team to the World Youth Championship in the United Arab Emirates. He became the right-hand man to former national team coach Henri Michel.

He died of a suspected heart attack at the age of 52, following a training session before the Ivory Coast v Egypt World Cup qualifying game.

External links
Ivory Coast lose coach
Profile

Ivorian footballers
Ivory Coast international footballers
Nîmes Olympique players
Montpellier HSC players
Ivorian expatriate footballers
Expatriate footballers in France
Ligue 1 players
Ligue 2 players
1951 births
2004 deaths
People from Zanzan District
Association football midfielders
AC Avignonnais players